Lan'an Township (Mandarin: 岚安乡) is a township in Luding County, Garzê Tibetan Autonomous Prefecture, Sichuan, China.

References 

Populated places in the Garzê Tibetan Autonomous Prefecture
Township-level divisions of Sichuan